James Campbell Hay (28 December 1885 – 18 October 1936) was a New Zealand cricketer. He played in five first-class matches for Canterbury from 1917 to 1919.

See also
 List of Canterbury representative cricketers

References

External links
 

1885 births
1936 deaths
New Zealand cricketers
Canterbury cricketers
Sportspeople from Akaroa